WWWC (1240 AM), also known as 3WC, is a 24-hour Southern gospel radio station located in Wilkesboro, North Carolina, United States, serving Wilkes County. The station is owned by Foothills Media, Inc. and broadcasts with 1 kilowatt at 1240 kHz on the AM band, as well as over the internet.

History

On November 20, 1968, Paul Cashion and J.B. Wilson, doing business as Wilkes County Radio, obtained the construction permit for a new 100-watt radio station in Wilkesboro. WWWC signed on January 26, 1970, with a country format. Power was increased to 500 watts day/250 night later that year. Not long after, the station shifted toward a Top 40 format, which remained for most of the next 30 years.
Tomlinson Broadcasting acquired WWWC in 1983 for $410,000. The station went silent on November 11, 1992 until the station was purchased by Ken Byrd, Alan Combs and John Wishon and adopted its Southern gospel format on July 11, 1994. 3WC is currently owned by John Wishon, who bought out the station from co-owner Alan Combs in 2006 for $200,000.

Translators
In addition to the main station, WWWC is relayed by translators to widen its broadcast area. Cumberland Communities Communications Corporation, owner of WDVX, sold the Wilkesboro frequency to Foothills Media Inc. for $20,000. In July 2019, a second transmitter was put in place near Elkin, adding an FM signal to the northeast of Wilkesboro.

References

External links

WWC
Wilkes County, North Carolina
Southern Gospel radio stations in the United States